The 1991–92 Slovenian Second League season started on 25 August 1991 and ended on 14 June 1992. League was divided into the East and West groups. Each team played a total of 26 matches.

East standing

West standing

Relegation play-offs

Tabor Sežana won 3–2 on aggregate.

See also
1991–92 Slovenian PrvaLiga

External links
Football Association of Slovenia 

Slovenian Second League seasons
2
Slovenia